The Privilege of Parliament Act 1603 or the Parliamentary Privilege Act 1603 (1 Jac 1 c 13) is an Act of the Parliament of England.

This Act was partly in force in Great Britain at the end of 2010.

This Act was retained for the Republic of Ireland by section 2(2)(a) of, and Part 2 of Schedule 1 to, the Statute Law Revision Act 2007.

References
Halsbury's Statutes,

External links
The Privilege of Parliament Act 1603, as amended, from Legislation.gov.uk.
List of legislative effects from the Irish Statute Book.

Acts of the Parliament of England (1485–1603)
1603 in law
1603 in England